
Year 459 (CDLIX) was a common year starting on Thursday (link will display the full calendar) of the Julian calendar. At the time, it was known as the Year of the Consulship of Ricimer and Patricius (or, less frequently, year 1212 Ab urbe condita). The denomination 459 for this year has been used since the early medieval period, when the Anno Domini calendar era became the prevalent method in Europe for naming years.

Events 
 By place 

 Roman Empire 
 Emperor Leo I signs a peace treaty with the Ostrogoths. King Theodemir sends his son, Theoderic the Great, age 5, as a child hostage to Constantinople. He learns at court about Latin, military tactics and religion (until 469).

 Britannia 
 King Vortigern is burnt to death, while being besieged by a Romano-British force under Ambrosius Aurelianus at Ganarew (Herefordshire). 

 Europe 
 The Franks conquer the city of Trier. The Frankish Kingdom becomes a military power and gets involved in Roman politics.
 Remigius, age 22, is elected bishop of Reims (approximate date).

 Asia 
 King Dhatusena of Anuradhapura of the Moriyan dynasty rules over Sri Lanka. During his reign the Avukana Buddha statue is built.

Births 
 November 15 – B'utz Aj Sak Chiik, king of Palenque (Mexico)

Deaths 
 September 2 – Simeon Stylites, Christian pillar-saint
 Hormizd III, king of the Sasanian Empire (approximate date)
 Vortigern, king of the Britons (approximate date)

References